Maura Gale (sometimes credited as Maula Gale) is an American actress who is best known for her voice role in Metal Gear Solid 2: Sons of Liberty as Fortune. She has also voiced video games like Enter the Matrix, as well as the female voice of Guillo in the Gamecube RPG Baten Kaitos Origins. She also has recurring, guest star and/or Co star appearances in TV shows such as Kingdom Business,  Ordinary Joe, Amazing Stories,  Dynasty, Bigger, Saints and Sinners, Strong Medicine, NYPD Blue, and Ally McBeal, and in films Under The Stadium Lights, Woman Thou Art Loosed , Their Eyes Were Watching God and Supreme Sanction.  She hosts a weekly radio show and podcast,  ‘’OMG Oh Maura Gale Radio Show’’ and is a Co producer, Co star and Co writer of the award winning docudramedy film STEM The Movement.

Filmography

Film

Television

Video games

References

External links
Official Website

African-American actresses
American film actresses
American stage actresses
American television actresses
American video game actresses
American voice actresses
Living people
20th-century American actresses
21st-century American actresses
Year of birth missing (living people)
20th-century African-American women
20th-century African-American people
21st-century African-American women
21st-century African-American people